Florentus Hazzard Willis Dill (1 September 1918 – 20 August 2001) was a Bermudian sprinter. He competed in the men's 200 metres at the 1948 Summer Olympics.

References

1918 births
2001 deaths
Athletes (track and field) at the 1948 Summer Olympics
Bermudian male sprinters
Olympic athletes of Bermuda
Place of birth missing
People from Sandys Parish